Events in the year 1981 in Greece.

Incumbents
President – Konstantinos Karamanlis
Prime Minister of Greece – Georgios Rallis (until 21 October), Andreas Papandreou (starting 21 October)

Events
1 January - Greece joins European Communities.
24 February – The 6.7  Gulf of Corinth earthquake shook the area with a maximum Mercalli intensity of VIII (Severe), killing 22, injuring 400, and causing $812 million in damage.

Births
8 January – Ioannis Kokkodis, swimmer
23 March – Aikaterini Mamouti, artistic gymnast

Deaths

References

 
Years of the 20th century in Greece
Greece
1980s in Greece
Greece